West Wales Wild Boars were a rugby league team based in St Clears, Carmarthenshire. They played in the Welsh Premier of the Rugby League Conference.

History
West Wales Wild Boars were formed in 2009 and joined the Welsh Premier Division of the Rugby League Conference that same year. They played their first game against Newport Titans, which they lost 40-24.

CPC Bears RL was formed in 2010, as the regional side for Carmarthenshire, Pembrokeshire and Ceredigion in the Welsh Premier Division with West Wales Wild Boars competing in the Championship. The Welsh Championship was given a re-structure following West Wales Wild Boars and three other West Wales clubs not fulfilling fixtures. They were replaced with newly formed Dyffryn Devils.

See also

List of rugby league clubs in Britain

References

External links

 Official website
 West Wales Rugby League
 Official Wales Rugby League Website

Rugby League Conference teams
Rugby league in Wales
Sport in Carmarthenshire
Welsh rugby league teams
Rugby clubs established in 2009